Jeanne Blancard (1884-1972) was a French composer and pianist.

Early life 
In 1884, Blancard was born in France. Blancard's mother was Célestine Blancard, a composer.

Career 
Blancard was a child prodigy. Before Blancard was 8 years old, she had already composed the Six pièces pour le piano. In 1894, when Blancard was 10 years old, the Pastorale  pour le piano, the Première valse, the Marche nuptiale were published. 
Blancard's fame crossed the Atlantic. 
At twenty, Blancard gave concerts at the Salle Pleyel, a concert hall in Paris, France. 
Blancard was a professor at the École Normale de Musique de Paris; among her pupils were Éric Gaudibert, Françoise Deslogères, and Jacques Greys.

Works 
Pastorale pour le piano Op. 8; illustrated by H. Viollet (Maquet 1894) Score on Gallica
Première valse (Maquet 1894) Score on Gallica
Six pièces pour le piano (Maquet 1894) Score on Gallica
Fileuse (Maquet 1897) Score on Gallica
Marche nuptiale pour le piano (Maquet 1894) Score on Gallica
Principes élémentaires de la technique pianistique: d'après la méthode Alfred Cortot (Salabert 1938)

References

External links 
 List of compositions by Jeanne Blancard at worldcat.org

Academic staff of the École Normale de Musique de Paris
20th-century French women classical pianists
1884 births
1972 deaths
20th-century French composers
Women music educators
20th-century women composers